Nyíradony is a district in north-eastern part of Hajdú-Bihar County. Nyíradony is also the name of the town where the district seat is found. The district is located in the Northern Great Plain Statistical Region. This district is a part of Nyírség geographical region.

Geography 
Nyíradony District borders with Nagykálló District and Nyírbátor District (Szabolcs-Szatmár-Bereg County) to the north, the Romanian county of Bihor to the east, Derecske District to the south, Debrecen District to the west. The number of the inhabited places in Nyíradony District is 9.

Municipalities 
The district has 2 towns, 2 large villages and 5 villages.
(ordered by population, as of 1 January 2012)

The bolded municipalities are cities, italics municipalities are large villages.

Demographics

In 2011, it had a population of 29,534 and the population density was 58/km².

Ethnicity
Besides the Hungarian majority, the main minority is the Roma (approx. 2,500).

Total population (2011 census): 29,534
Ethnic groups (2011 census): Identified themselves: 28,679 persons:
Hungarians: 26,140 (91.15%)
Gypsies: 2,263 (7.89%)
Others and indefinable: 276 (0.96%)
Approx. 1,000 persons in Nyíradony District did not declare their ethnic group at the 2011 census.

Religion
Religious adherence in the county according to 2011 census:

Catholic – 12,677 (Greek Catholic – 8,485; Roman Catholic – 4,191);
Reformed – 8,242;
other religions – 446; 
Non-religious – 2,777; 
Atheism – 84;
Undeclared – 5,308.

Gallery

See also
List of cities and towns of Hungary

References

External links
 Postal codes of the Nyíradony District

Districts in Hajdú-Bihar County